Elizabeth Lake is a freshwater lake located in Waterford Township, Michigan, along the Clinton River. It connects upstream to 90-acre Crescent Lake and downstream to 1,280-acre Cass Lake.

The lake is located south of Elizabeth Lake Road, north of Cass-Elizabeth Road, east of Cooley Lake Road, and west of Cass Lake Roads. The sand-bottom lake is 363 acres, making it the thirteenth largest lake in Oakland County, Michigan. At its deepest point, the lake is 72 feet deep.

Namesake
Elizabeth Lake was named for Elizabeth Cass, the wife of Territorial Governor of Michigan Lewis Cass

Surroundings
Elizabeth Lake is surrounded by residential neighborhoods on all sides of the lake, with many varieties of waterfront homes, ranging from 800 square foot to 5,400 square foot homes. The eclectic home styles on Elizabeth Lake include bungalows, Cape Cods, colonial, ranches and split levels. The homes on the lake were built as far back as the 1940s.

Fish
Elizabeth Lake contains a variety of fish, including black crappie, bluegill, largemouth bass, northern pike, rock bass, smallmouth bass, sunfish, walleye and yellow perch.

References

Geography of Oakland County, Michigan
Lakes of Oakland County, Michigan
Lakes of Michigan
Lakes of Waterford Township, Michigan